(), also known more simply as , is the former national anthem of the Marshall Islands.  It became the anthem from 1979 when it was separated from the Trust Territory of the Pacific Islands, and it remained the national anthem when the Republic of the Marshall Islands gained its independence in 1986, until 1991 when Forever Marshall Islands became the new national anthem.

The music was composed by Samuel Langrine, and the Marshallese lyrics are of unknown origin.

Lyrics

Marshallese

New orthography

Old orthography

Pronunciation 
[]
[]
[]
[]
[]
[]
[]
[]

English translation 
I love my islands,
Where I was born,
The surroundings, the paths,
And the gatherings.
I cannot leave here,
Because this is my rightful place,
My family heritage is forever here.
It is best for me to die here.

References

External links 
  by R.M.I. Band
 Older performance of 

Historical national anthems
National symbols of the Marshall Islands
Marshallese music
Marshallese language
Oceanian anthems